The Dalles High School (TDHS), formerly The Dalles Wahtonka High School (TDW) is a public high school located in The Dalles, Oregon, United States. It houses students from both The Dalles and the adjacent town of Mosier.

History
In 2004, North Wasco County School Districts 9 and 12 combined to form one school district in The Dalles: SD 21 (this number being chosen as it is the sum of 9 and 12). School District 21 immediately combined Wahtonka High School and The Dalles High School into "The Dalles Wahtonka Union High School". Later the "Union" was dropped, shortening the name to "The Dalles Wahtonka High School".

In 2012, the Oregon State Board of Education adopted a rule to ban the use of Native American names and imagery for use in school mascots. As a result, The Dalles-Wahtonka High School changed its name to The Dalles High School, and its mascot from the Eagle-Indians to the Riverhawks, in April 2014. The 2014–2015 school year was the first year of The Dalles Riverhawks.

Campus

Main campus
The main campus has housed grades 9–12 since the 2009–2010 school year.

Academics
The Dalles High School currently uses a Trimester system as opposed to the standard semester System. The Dalles hosts a number of required common academics courses as well as offering College Now courses with an agreement with Columbia Gorge Community College to earn college credit early. The Dalles High School also offers students Advanced Placement Courses as another means to earn accredited college credit prior to graduating High School.

List of current Advanced Placement courses 
source:
US History
European History
World History
US Government
Literature
Language and Composition
Biology
Art
In 2018, 85% of the school's seniors received a high school diploma.

The Dalles High School also offers six current career and technical education (C.T.E) programs and currently is in the process of adding a seventh for students to participate in.

List of current CTE programs 
Woods/Construction
Welding/Fabrication
Automechanics
Culinary
Graphic Arts
Computer Science/Information Technology

Notable alumni 
John Callahan, Cartoonist
H.L Davis, Novelist, Poet, and Pulitzer Prize winner.
Greg Walden, Congressman
John H. Dick, Basketball Player and Rear Admiral in the U.S Navy.
Shemia Fagan, State Senator and Secretary of State of Oregon.

See also
 Pulpit Rock (The Dalles, Oregon)

References

External links

 
 North Wasco County School District 21

Buildings and structures in The Dalles, Oregon
High schools in Wasco County, Oregon
Public high schools in Oregon
2004 establishments in Oregon